Carlton Dabney (born January 26, 1947) is a former American football defensive tackle. He played for the Atlanta Falcons in 1968.

References

1947 births
Living people
American football defensive tackles
Morgan State Bears football players
Atlanta Falcons players